Whitbourne Hall is a grade II* listed Greek Revival country house located in the village of Whitbourne in Herefordshire (near the Worcestershire border), England.

The hall was first constructed in 1860 by the architect E. W. Elmslie, who also designed the Great Malvern railway station, as well as a number of other notable buildings in Worcestershire. The house was built for Edward Bickerton Evans, an amateur archaeologist who had made his fortune from the vinegar factory set up by his father. His firm, Hill and Evans, had their London HQ at 33–35 Eastcheap built to the elaborate Gothic designs of Robert Lewis Roumieu, who is believed to have added the conservatory to the house.

Today, Whitbourne Hall is situated in eight acres of gardens, and is divided into twenty-three private residences. However, the hall is periodically open to the public (every Monday in May and June), and is also hired out as a venue for weddings, private receptions and corporate events. The hall and grounds are also used for cultural events such as theatre productions and choral performances. It is also home to the Four Shires Festival.

In April 2010, Whitbourne Hall was the subject of a Channel 4 television documentary presented by hotelier Ruth Watson as part of her Country House Rescue series.

References

External links
 Whitbourne Hall homepage

Grade II* listed buildings in Herefordshire
Country houses in Herefordshire